Prime Time is a BBC Books original novel written by Mike Tucker and based on the long-running British science fiction television series Doctor Who. (1963-1989 & 2005-) It features the Seventh Doctor, played in the BBC TV Show by Sylvester McCoy, and his companion Ace. It was published in July 2000 and follows the story of the pair on the zombie planet 'Blinni Gaar'.

Synopsis

Detecting a mysterious sub-space signal in the Time Vortex, the Doctor and Ace land on the planet 'Blinni Gaar'. They soon discover that the native population are little more than zombies, addicted to the programmes of the dangerously powerful Channel 400. As the Doctor investigates, he finds that the television company has a sinister agenda that has nothing to do with entertainment.

References

2000 British novels
2000 science fiction novels
Past Doctor Adventures
Seventh Doctor novels
British science fiction novels
The Master (Doctor Who) novels
Novels by Mike Tucker